Clondegad GAA  is a Gaelic Athletic Association club located in the village of Ballynacally, County Clare in Ireland. The club field teams exclusively in Gaelic Football competitions.	

In 2015, Clondegad reached the semi-finals of the Clare Senior Football Championship by defeating 2014 champions Cratloe.

Major honours
 Clare Senior Football Championship Runners-Up: 2017
 Clare Football League Div. 1 (Cusack Cup) (1): 1936 (as Ballynacally)
 Clare Intermediate Football Championship (2): 1944, 2011
 Clare Junior A Football Championship (4): 1942 (as Ballycorick), 1963 (as Moohane), 1969, 2000
 Clare Under-21 A Football Championship (1): 2012

Notable players
 Gary Brennan
 Paul Flanagan
 Tony Kelly

References

External links
Official Site

Gaelic games clubs in County Clare
Hurling clubs in County Clare